USS Avocet may refer to the following ships of the United States Navy:

 , laid down as Minesweeper No. 19 on 13 September 1917 at Baltimore, Maryland
 , laid down as LCI(L)-653 on 14 June 1944 at Barber, New Jersey

References 
 

United States Navy ship names